These are the lists related to the Family of Emperor Bayinnaung of the Toungoo Dynasty of Burma. The king had over 50 wives and nearly 100 children. All the Toungoo monarchs after him were descended from him.

Ancestry
His ancestry is unclear. The chronicles claim that he was of royal ancestry (from all the previous main Upper Burma dynasties) while oral traditions say he was of commoner origins.

Queens consort

Principal queens
Bayinnaung had three queens consort. After the death of his first chief queen Atula Thiri in 1568, Sanda Dewi became the chief and only queen for the remainder of his reign (1568–81).

Junior queens
The following is a list of junior queens who bore him at least one child per the Hmannan Yazawin chronicle (Hmannan Vol. 3 2003: 68–73). Several of the queens came over through marriages of state.

Below are other junior wives who appeared elsewhere in the chronicles. They have to account for the king's children (Waradamas, Kaweya Hla Nyi, Thukhawaddy, Min A-Kyi, Thugandawaddy, Myat Myo Hpone Wai and Myo Myat Hpone Si) whose mothers' names are unknown.

Issue

By senior queens
The king had three daughters and three sons by his senior queens.

By junior queens
The following is a list of his children by junior queens. The list is ordered by the mother of the children, and then by the age of the children per the Hmannan Yazawin chronicle. Note that although both Maha Yazawin and Hmannan chronicles say that he had 35 sons and 56 daughters by junior queens and concubines, the detailed list, which appears only in Hmannan (Hmannan Vol. 3 2003: 68–73), enumerates only 86 children (32 sons, 54 daughters). The rest of the children are mentioned in the various parts of the chronicles. The grand total comes to at least 92 different names which consisted of 33 sons and 59 daughters. The discrepancy may be due to recording errors in the sex and/or number of the unnamed children who died young.

{| width=75% class="wikitable"
|-
! style="background-color:#B9D1FF" | #
! style="background-color:#B9D1FF" | Name
! style="background-color:#B9D1FF" | Mother
! style="background-color:#B9D1FF" | Brief
|-
|1. 
| Shin Ubote
| Khin Pyezon
| Son Governor of Nyaungyan (1574–81)  Married to half-sister Ne Thila  Died January 1581
|-
| 2.
| Nyaungyan
| Khin Pyezon
| Son King of Burma (r. 1599–1605)
|-
| 3.
| Shin Nan Myint
| Shin Lat I, daughter of Letwe Khon-Thu
| Son Governor of Taungdwin (1574–99?)  married to half-sister Thitawaddy Thit 
|-
| 4.
| unnamed son
| Shin Lat II, daughter of Letya Nan-Thu
| Died young
|-
| 5.
| Thitawaddy Thit
| Shin Lat II, daughter of Letya Nan-Thu
| Daughter married to half-brother Shin Nan Myint, Gov. of Taungdwin
|-
| 6.
| Sanda Dewi
| Shin Lat II, daughter of Letya Nan-Thu
| Daughter
|-
| 7.
| Kalapangha 
| Shin Lat II, daughter of Letya Nan-Thu
| Son Governor of Zeyawaddy  m. to half-sister Khin Kaung  deported to Arakan in 1600
|-
| 8.
| Kaweya Hla Oo
| Shin Lat II, daughter of Letya Nan-Thu 
| Daughter married to King Naresuan of Ayutthaya 
|-
|-
| 9.
| Yusiyawatta
| Shin Lat II, daughter of Letya Nan-Thu
| Daughter married to half brother Shin Pyit-Sunt
|-
| 10.
| Thila Ginga
| Shin Lat II, daughter of Letya Nan-Thu
| Son
|-
| 11.
| Khin Myat Lay
| Khin Htwe I, daughter of Letya Nan-Thu
| Daughter; Died at age 8 (9th year)
|-
| 12.
| Shin Myat Tan  (Shin Myat Lay)
| Khin Htwe I, daughter of Letya Nan-Thu
| Son Governor of Yamethin
|-
| 13.
| Okkasara
| Khin Htwe I, daughter of Letya Nan-Thu
| Son
|-
| 14.
| Thiri Yadana
| Khin Htwe I, daughter of Letya Nan-Thu
| Daughter
|-
| 15.
| Nara Thiha
| Khin Htwe I, daughter of Letya Nan-Thu
| Son
|-
| 16.
| Myat In-Phyo
| Khin Saw I
| Daughter married to half-brother Shin Myat Lay, Governor of Yamethin
|-
| 17.
| Thiha Kyawhtin
| Khin Saw I
| Son married to half-sister Khin Hpone Si
|-
| 18.
| Thuganda Kalaya
| Khin Saw I
| Daughter married to Thigamari
|-
| 19.
| Thiha Kyawthu
| Khin Saw I 
| Son Governor of Bayaung in Lan Na with title Minye Nawrahta 
|-
| 20.
| Khin Hla
| Khin Saw I
| Daughter
|-
| 21.
| Hnaung Myint Hpone Shi
| Khin Saw I
| Daughter
|-
| 22.
| Khin Hpone Shi
| Khin Pu Sao Nang Yi Hkam Hkong the daughter of Hso Klang Hpa the saopha of Hsipaw 
| Daughter married to Governor of Kawliya
|-
| 23.
| Khin Kaung
| Khin Pu Sao Nang Yi Hkam Hkong the daughter of Hso Klang Hpa the saopha of Hsipaw 
| Daughter married to Binnya Nandameit, Governor of Zeyawaddy
|-
| 24.
| Manithala
| Khin Pu Sao Nang Yi Hkam Hkong the daughter of Hso Klang Hpa the saopha of Hsipaw 
| Daughter married to Minye Kyawswa II of Ava
|-
| 25.
| Shin Aung Kyaw
| Khin Myo Htut, the daughter of Shwenankyawshin of Ava 
| Son Governor of Salay during the reigns of Bayinnaung and Nanda  Governor of Pagan with the title of Thiri Dhammathawka during the reign of Nyaungyan  married to half-sister Thiri Sanda
|-
| 26.
| Shin Htwe Kyaing
| Khin Myo Htut, the daughter of Shwenankyawshin of Ava 
| Son Governor of Kun-Ohn; later Gov. of Myede  sent to Arakan in 1600; received the title Minye Nandameit in Arakan  married to daughter of Thado Dhamma Yaza II of Prome  married half-sister Khin Hpone Si, widow of Thiha Kyawhtin, in Arakan
|-
| 27.
| Thiri Sanda
| Khin Chan
| Daughter married to half-brother Shin Aung Kyaw, Governor of Salay
|-
| 28.
| Khin Hpone Si
| Khin Htwe II  Sao Nang Ket Thwa, daughter of the Sao Laeb Hpa the saopha" of Mogaung
| Daughter married to half-brother Thiha Kyawhtin  sent to Arakan in 1600; married half-brother Shin Htwe Kyaing there
|-
| 29.
| Minye Aung Naing
| Sanda Thukha
| Son Governor of Legaing
|-
| 30.
| Khin Gyi
| Sanda Thukha
| Daughter married to Nandameit, Governor of Kyaukmaw
|-
| 31.
| Khin Lat
| Sanda Thukha
| Daughter married to Baya Zeya
|-
| 32.
| Min Shwe-Khe
| Sanda Thukha
| Daughter married to King Oun Moeng the saopha of Chiang Rung 
|-
| 33.
| Utamayit
| Shin Mi Myat
| Son Governor of Sagaing  married to half-sister Khin Hpone Myat II in 1574
|-
| 34.
| Manawha
| Shin Mi Myat
| Daughter married to half-brother Shin Myat Lay, Governor of Sampanago or Wanmaw 
|-
| 35.
| Hnin Hnaung Htwe Myat
| Shin Mi Myat
| Daughter married to Minye Kyawswa of Toungoo
|-
| 36.
| Khin Min Myat
| Khin Min Phyu
| Daughter married to half-brother Minye Aung Naing
|-
| 37.
| Shin Myat Lay
| Khin Min Phyu
| Son Governor of Sampanago or Wanmaw  m. to half-sister Manawha
|-
| 38.
| Khin Hpone San
| Khin Min Phyu
| Daughter married to Minye Kyawswa of Toungoo
|-
| 39.
| unnamed daughter
| Khin Min Phyu
| Died young
|-
| 40.
| Bodaw Ba Khin
| Khin Gyi
| Son Governor of Yamethin  m. to half-sister Kaweya Hla Nyi
|-
| 41.
| Yadana Nyunt Thit
| Zinyon Minthami Gyi  Sao Nang Oo Thing Hpa, daughter of King Oun Moeng the saopha of Chiang Rung
| Daughter married to half-brother King Nanda Bayin and later married to King Naresuan of Ayutthaya
|-
| 42.
| Khin Myit  (Khin Hpone Myint)
| Sanda Yathi, daughter of Binnya Ran II King of Hanthawaddy
| Daughter married to Nandameit, son of Governor of Wingapu (or Wuttaku)
|-
| 43.
| Saw Ne Htwe
| Sanda Yathi, daughter of Binnya Ran II King of Hanthawaddy
| Daughter married to her half-nephew Min Mon, son of her half-brother Shin Nan Myint, Governor of Taungdwin
|-
| 44.
| Ne Thila
| Manithayi, daughter of Binnya Ran II King of Hanthawaddy
| Daughter married to half-brother Shin Ubote, Governor of Nyaungyan
|-
| 45.
| Yodaya Naing
| Khin Gyi Min (Manurah), daughter of Aung Naing Lu Kyaw (King Maha Chakkraphat) of Ayutthaya Kingdom
| Son Governor of Kyaukse
|-
| 46.
| Khin Hpone Myat I  (Khin Hpone Thit)
| Khin Gyi Sit, the daughter of Letya Thura
| Daughter married to Sithu, Governor of Myaungmya and son of Thinkhaya of Pakhan
|-
| 47.
| Thiha Kyaw
| Khin Gyi Sit, the daughter of Letya Thura
| Son Governor of Danubyu 
|-
| 48.
| Pyinsa Kalaya
| Khin Gyi Sit, the daughter of Letya Thura
| Daughter married to Nanda Kyawthu, Governor of Sula and son of Thinkhaya of Pakhan
|-
| 49.
| Awrat
| Thudhamma  Daughter of Town Hkam Fu the saopha of Chiang Tung (send from Lan Xang) 
| Son Governor of Kyundaung
|-
| 50.
| Yaza Kalaya 
| Thudhamma  Daughter of Town Hkam Fu the saopha of Chiang Tung (send from Lan Xang) 
| Daughter married to Sao Hkam Town the saopha of Chiang Tung
|-
| 51.
| Myat San Paw
| Khin Lat
| Son Governor of Hlaing-Tet  married to half-sister Khin Mi-Ya
|-
| 52.
| Eka Kalaya
| Khin Lat
| Daughter married to Letya Zala Thingyan, Governor of Kyet-Tha
|-
| 53.
| unnamed daughter
| Khin Lat
| Died young
|-
| 54.
| Khin Mi Ya
| Kywepauk Kadaw
| Daughter married to half-brother Myat San Paw, Governor of Hlaing-Tet
|-
| 55.
| Yadana Sagga
| Khin Ne Thauk
| Daughter married to Ngawk Sieng Hpa, the saopha of Lawksawk 
|-
| 56.
| Wara Thiha
| Khin Hpone Gyi
| Son Governor of Ta-lok Myo or Tak in present day
|-
| 57.
| Nara Dhamma
| Khin Hpone Gyi
| Son Governor of Tagaung
|-
| 58.
| Agga Dathta
| Khin Hpone Gyi
| Son Governor of Halingyi or Halin in present
|-
| 59.
| Yadana In-Su
| Khin Aung Kham  Sao Nang Aung Hkam, daughter of Sao Hso Kaw Hpa the saopha of Mong Pai the King Mobye Narapati of Ava 
| Daughter married to King Naresuan of Ayutthaya 
|-
| 60.
| Arenalokwaddy
| Khin Myat San  Sao Nang Mani San Hpa, daughter of Hso Perng Moeng the saopha of Mogaung
| Daughter married to King Naresuan of Ayutthaya 
|-
| 61.
| Wakinzanahtetwaddyka
| Khin Myat San  Sao Nang Mani San Hpa, daughter of Hso Perng Moeng the saopha of Mogaung
| Daughter married to King Naresuan of Ayutthaya 
|-
| 62.
| Shin Myat Kyaw
| Khin Hnin Nwe  Keo Kumari, daughter of King Photisarath of Lan Xang
| Son Governor of Mong Hsat
|-
| 63.
| Upasanda
| Khin Shwe Pan  Sao Nang Suriya Vivamsa, daughter of Ngawk Chew Hpa the saopha of Wanmaw
| Son Governor of Pagan the old name of Xiang Khouang in Laos with the title of Nawrahta in the reign of Anaukpetlun  married to half-sister Hpone Myo Myat Hla
|-
| 64.
| Soe Min Myat Hla
| Khin Htwe Nyo
| Daughter married to 1st cousin Pyinsa Thiha, Gov. of Tayotmaw and son of Thado Dhamma Yaza II of Prome
|-
| 65.
| Khin Chit Myat
| Khin Saw II, daughter of Min Maha of Yamethin 
| Daughter married to half-nephew Min Thiha, son of Governor of Taungdwin;  Min Thiha later became Minye Uzana, Governor of Mabe, Myanmar|Mabe in the reign of Thalun
|-
| 66.
| Hpone Myo Myat Hla
| Nyaungshwe Minthami  Sao Nang Varma Kantha , granddaughter of Hkam Ai Lan the saopha of Yawnghwe
| Daughter married to half-brother Upasanda (Nawrahta of Xiang Khouang)
|-
| 67.
| Hpone Myo Mithila 
| Yo-Mya-Ong-Kone, Ramarak Ongkarn (Princess Sukhuma), daughter of Town Sen Moeng Langanakaya, the Gov.of Ong-Kone of Lan Xang and ex-queen of Setthathirath the King of Lan Xang 
| Daughter married to King Naresuan of Ayutthaya
|-
| 68.
| Komma Kyawthu
| Zinyon Minthami Nge  Sao Nang Mani Inn Hsawng, daughter of King Inn Moeng the saopha of Chiang Rung
| Son Governor of Vieng Phoukha in reign Nanda Bayin
|-
| 69.
| unnamed son
| Gon Minthami  Sao Nang Hern Khway, daughter of Sao Town Hkam Fu the saopha of Chiang Tung 
| Died young 
|-
| 70. 
| Ne Myo Kyawhtin
| Gon Minthami  Sao Nang Hern Khway, daughter of Sao Town Hkam Fu the saopha of Chiang Tung 
| Son Governor of Naypyidaw 
|-
| 71.
| Thudathta
| Akyaw Minthami
| Son Became a monk, east of Toungoo, and later assassinated by Karens there, but saved
|-
| 72.
| Khin Win Hson
| Thukha Hsaya, the daughter of Hso Klang Hpa the saopha of Hsipaw 
| Daughter married to Tap Hseng Hkam, the saopha of Hsipaw 
|-
| 73.
| Thumpaya Myint 
| Thukha Hsaya, the daughter of Hso Klang Hpa the saopha of Hsipaw
| Son Governor of Bagan 
|-
| 74.
| unnamed daughter
| Elder daughter of Shan-Paik Htaung Hmu
| Died young
|-
| 75.
| Phyo Hpone Wai
| Khin Htwe Hla
| Daughter married to Baya Zeya  Children: Shin Wara and Myindwin Kadaw
|-
| 76.
| Eka Thura
| Khin Htwe Hla
| Son Governor of Kyaung Thu (Waw in present day) 
|-
| 77.
| Min Hla
| Younger daughter of Shan-Paik Htaung Hmu
| Daughter married to 1st cousin Pyinsa Thiha, Governor of Tayotmaw and son of Thado Dhamma Yaza II of Prome
|-
| 78.
| Myat Hpone Wai
| Younger daughter of Shan-Paik Htaung Hmu
| Daughter married to Nanda Kyawhtin (later Kyawhtin Nawrahta of Pegu in the reign of Minye Thihathu II of Toungoo)
|-
| 79.
| unnamed daughter
| Younger daughter of Shan-Paik Htaung Hmu
| Died young
|-
| 80.
| Khin Hpone Myat II
| Khin Htwe Phyu
| Daughter married to Utamayit Governor of Sagaing
|-
| 81.
| Min A-Htwe 
| Suphankanlaya, daughter of King Maha Thammarachathirat of Ayutthaya Kingdom 
| Daughter married to Prince Kaolad, son of Hso Ka Hpa received with the title of Athinkhaya by Bayinnaung the son of Sao Mong Hkam the saopha of Mohnyin
|-
| 82.
| Khaymawaddy
| Khin San Paw
| Daughter married to Hkam Kaing Nwe, the saopha of Hsenwi 
|-
| 83.
| Yaza Meitta
| Khin Kauk  Khin Hkong, daughter of the King Mekuti of Chiang Mai
| Daughter married to 1st cousin Governor of Taingda, son of Thado Dhamma Yaza II of Prome
|-
| 84.
| Shin Pyit Sunt
| Khin Hpone Htut
| Son married to half-sister Yusiyawatta
|-
| 85.
| Khin Nyunt
| Khin Saw III
| Daughter married to Yaza Thingyan, Governor of Tavoy
|-
| 86.
| Khin Hpone Myint
| Shin Htwe Myat
| Daughter Queen consort of Burma (1599–1605)  married to half-brother Nyaungyan
|-
| 87.
| Kaytumatiwaddy Pate 
| Kathe Minthami Trailokya Mulilokvalliyar, daughter of King Chalampa raja of Manipur 
| Daughter married to King Khagemba of Manipur
|- 
| 88. 
| Narathu 
| Sountaritiwaka, daughter of Sukhaamphaa the saopha of Ahom dynasty 
| Son Governor of Beikthano
|- 
| 89. 
| Thuyiya Sanda 
| Theinni Minthami Sao Nang Hung Kyaing Hpa, daughter of Hkam Pak Hpa the saopha of Hsenwi 
| Son Governor of Monywa
|- 
| 90. 
| Mukdawaddyhtet 
| Sao Nang Yon Thit, daughter of Hso Yen Hpa the saopha of Gengma in Yunnan
| Daughter married to prince Nyebawhtin of Ayutthaya Kingdom
|- 
| 91. 
| Yaza Thingyan
| Mainglon Minthami Sao Nang Mani Inn Hpan, daughter of Sai Mauk Hpa the Hkonmaing of Mainglon, and great granddaughter of Hkonmaing I of Onbaung–Hsipaw) 
| Son Governor of Tavoy
|} 

The following are the children (1 son, 5 daughters) whose names are not listed in Hmannan's detailed list but appear in other parts of in both Maha Yazawin and Hmannan''.

Siblings

Full siblings
He had four full siblings.

Half siblings
He had two half-siblings, who were born to his father and his maternal aunt.

Notable relations

Nephews and nieces

Grandchildren and beyond

In-laws

Modern descendants
A 17th generation descendant of his still holds hereditary office in Bohmong Circle (modern-day Bandarban District) in the Chittagong Hill Tracts region of Bangladesh.

Notes

References

Bibliography
 
 
 
 
 
 

Toungoo dynasty